The Redistribution of Seats Act 1885 redefined the boundaries of English, Scottish and Welsh constituencies of the House of Commons of the Parliament of the United Kingdom (at Westminster), and the new boundaries were first used in the 1885 general election. The boundaries of Irish constituencies were not affected.

1885 boundaries were used also in the general elections of 1886, 1892, 1895, 1900, 1906, January 1910 and December 1910.

In Scotland, as a result of the legislation, there were 32 burgh constituencies, 37 county constituencies and two university constituencies. Except for Dundee, which was a two-seat constituency, each Scottish constituency represented a seat for one Member of Parliament (MP). Therefore, Scotland had 72 MPs.

The 1885 legislation detailed boundary changes but did not detail boundaries for all constituencies. For a complete picture of boundaries in Scotland, it has to be read in conjunction with the Representation of the People (Scotland) Act 1832 and the Representation of the People (Scotland) Act 1868.

In Scotland, constituencies related nominally to counties and burghs, but boundaries for parliamentary purposes were not necessarily those for other purposes. Also, county boundaries were altered by the Local Government (Scotland) Act 1889 and by later related legislation. The Representation of the People Act 1918 redefined constituency boundaries in relation to new local government boundaries, and these newer constituency boundaries were first used in the 1918 general election.

Burgh constituencies

County constituencies

University constituencies

See also 

 List of UK Parliamentary constituencies (1885-1918)

Notes and references 

 1885
1885 establishments in Scotland
1918 disestablishments in Scotland
Constituencies of the Parliament of the United Kingdom established in 1885
Constituencies of the Parliament of the United Kingdom disestablished in 1918